Commander Gordon Bridson,  (2 December 1909 – 6 December 1972) was a New Zealand swimmer who won two silver medals at the 1930 British Empire Games. He was also in the New Zealand Royal Naval Volunteer Reserve and in the Second World War, he served in the Royal New Zealand Navy. Seconded to the Royal Navy in 1940, he commanded a minesweeper vessel that accompanied coastal convoys along the English Channel. He was later the commander of the minesweeper  which, with her sister ship Moa, sunk the Japanese submarine I-1 off Guadalcanal in the Solomon Islands.

Early life
Gordon Bridson was born in Wellington in New Zealand on 2 December 1909. His parents were William Bridson, a manager, and Agnes Bridson . The Bridson family later moved to Auckland where he grew up. He was educated at Auckland Grammar School up to six form level. He then started working at a metal merchant. He began his naval career in 1927 by enlisting in the Auckland Division of the New Zealand Royal Naval Volunteer Reserve (RNVR) in Auckland. He quickly progressed to being a commissioned officer.

Second World War

Bridson was not immediately mobilised for war service following the outbreak of the Second World War in 1939. He was called up for duty in April the following year, receiving a promotion to lieutenant commander. The next month a group of RNVR personnel, including Bridson, were dispatched to England to serve in the Royal Navy. Once in England, Bridson was given command of HMT Walnut, a Tree-class minesweeper that belonged to the 25th anti-submarine and minesweeping flotilla. He was one of several New Zealanders commanding ships in the flotilla. For the next several months, Walnut helped protect convoys along the east coast of England and in the English Channel.

In late 1941, Bridson was appointed the commander of the newly built , one of three Bird-class minesweeping trawlers which had just been commissioned into the newly formed Royal New Zealand Navy (RNZN). After initial working up in Scotland, Kiwi accompanied a convoy that departed on 1 January 1942 to cross the North Atlantic to Newfoundland. While crossing the Atlantic, Kiwi encountered a severe storm which damaged the ship and necessitated repairs in Boston. It then continued onto New Zealand via a transit through the Panama Canal.  

In the 1942 King's Birthday Honours, Bridson was awarded the Distinguished Service Cross for his leadership the previous year as commander of Walnut. The published citation noted his "outstanding zeal, patience and cheerfulness."

Solomon Islands

Arriving in Auckland on 21 May 1942, the Kiwi, together with Moa and Tui, the two other Bird-class minesweepers, were assigned to the 25th Minesweeping Flotilla. At the time of the arrival of the Bird ships in New Zealand, the flotilla was operating in the waters around Fiji but in August 1942 was dispatched on anti-submarine duties around Noumea. Kiwi was sailing with the flotilla by the end of the following month. In December 1942 the flotilla set sail for deployment in the Solomon Islands in support of the Allied operations there.

The flotilla was initially used in anti-submarine patrols around Guadalcanal's Cape Esperance. On 14 January 1943 Kiwi was the subject of a friendly fire incident when in poor light an American PT boat fired two torpedoes at her which only just missed. Bridson subsequently became friends with the commander of the PT boat. Later the same month, in the late evening of 29 January, Kiwi and Moa was carrying out patrols around Guadalcanal with Bridson in overall command. A Japanese submarine, the I-1, was detected by Kiwi, which launched a series of depth charges. The I-1 surfaced so it could use its 5-inch gun on the much smaller minesweepers. The Kiwi repeatedly rammed the submarine while firing point blank with its own 4-inch gun and an unofficial 20-mm Oerlikon that had been installed on its bow while stationed at Noumea. The submarine was badly damaged but broke free. Eventually, chased by Moa, the I-1 was stranded and sank on a reef. During this action, three of the Kiwi's crew were wounded, one fatally. 

The damage to the Kiwi as a result of the engagement with the I-1 saw it return to New Zealand for repairs to her bow. Once back in Auckland, the crew of the Kiwi paraded down Queen Street to the city's town hall, where a civic reception was held in recognition of their exploits in sinking the I-1. For his role in the destruction of the Japanese submarine, Bridson was awarded the Distinguished Service Order and the United States Navy Cross.

Later military service
Once repairs were completed, Kiwi returned to the Solomon Islands in May 1943, although not before another friendly fire incident where she was fired upon by an American Liberty Ship. Bridson remained in command of Kiwi until May 1944 when he received a temporary promotion to commander and took over as naval officer-in-charge Dunedin. Six months later he was made commander in charge at Lyttelton. In April 1945, he was appointed as an honorary aide de camp to the Governor-General of New Zealand, Sir Cyril Newall. He remained in these posts until demobilisation from the RNZN in 1946.

Later life
Returning to civilian life, Bridson moved to Te Aroha, in the North Island and became involved in the hardware trade. Several years later he took up farming on a property near Cambridge, where he died on 6 December 1972. He was survived by his wife Ada , who he had married in March 1940, and three children.

Notes

References

Further reading

 "Epic sea battle". New Zealand Herald. 12 March 1943, page 2
 Obituary. The Dominion. 7 December 1972, page 7
 Harker, Jack (2000). The Rockies: New Zealand Minesweepers at War. Silver Owl Press. 

1909 births
1972 deaths
Commonwealth Games silver medallists for New Zealand
People educated at Auckland Grammar School
New Zealand farmers
Royal New Zealand Navy personnel of World War II
Swimmers at the 1930 British Empire Games
Commonwealth Games medallists in swimming
Recipients of the Navy Cross (United States)
Sportspeople from Te Aroha
New Zealand Companions of the Distinguished Service Order
Recipients of the Distinguished Service Cross (United Kingdom)
Medallists at the 1930 British Empire Games